The mountain bamboo partridge (Bambusicola fytchii) is a species of bird in the family Phasianidae. It is found in Bangladesh, Tibet, India, Laos, Myanmar, Thailand, and Vietnam.

The binomial commemorates Major-General Albert Fytche.

Their plumage is a mix of browns, cream and grey. They have distinctive black and white eye stripes and their breast and abdomen is pale with brown speckles.

Mountain bamboo partridges live close to water in bamboo scrub forest, tall grassland and degraded forest areas with bamboo groves. They remain under shrub cover for much of the day, moving into the open in the early morning and late evening to feed. They will only fly when threatened, returning to cover quickly.

Breeding occurs in the summer months between March and September. The nest is a simple scraped out dip in the ground lined with grass. The female incubates the eggs for 18 to 19 days. The male meanwhile stays close to the nest and feeds the female and, once hatched, the chicks.

The diet of the mountain bamboo partridge is primarily tender, young bamboo shoots and the fresh, young foliage, but also includes a wide variety of seeds, berries, shoots and invertebrates.

The mountain bamboo partridge is fairly common throughout its range. However, population numbers do appear to be declining. Areas of the bamboo partridges' habitat is cleared for agriculture but they have been seen living on the cultivated land. There is some evidence of hunting in parts of their range.

References

https://web.archive.org/web/20131029192704/http://www.twycrosszoo.org/mountain-bamboo-partridge.aspx

mountain bamboo partridge
Birds of Northeast India
Birds of Yunnan
Birds of Myanmar
Birds of Laos
mountain bamboo partridge
Taxonomy articles created by Polbot